Ric Jordan (born March 31, 1950) is a Canadian retired professional ice hockey defenceman who played 183 games in the World Hockey Association for the New England Whalers, Calgary Cowboys, and Quebec Nordiques. Jordan was born in Toronto, Ontario, Canada. As a youth, he played in the 1962 Quebec International Pee-Wee Hockey Tournament with Toronto Shopsy's.

Awards and honours

References

External links

1950 births
Boston University Terriers men's ice hockey players
Calgary Cowboys players
Canadian ice hockey defencemen
Erie Blades players
Jacksonville Barons players
EC KAC players
Living people
Maine Nordiques players
Montreal Canadiens draft picks
New England Whalers players
Quebec Nordiques (WHA) players
Rhode Island Eagles players
Ice hockey people from Toronto
Tidewater Sharks players
Toronto Marlboros players
NCAA men's ice hockey national champions